Gary Andrew Varsho (born June 20, 1961) is an American former professional baseball outfielder, manager, and coach, who played in Major League Baseball (MLB) for the Chicago Cubs, Pittsburgh Pirates, Cincinnati Reds, and Philadelphia Phillies.

Baseball career

As player
Varsho was selected by the Chicago Cubs in the fifth round (107th overall) of the 1982 June draft as a second baseman and made his MLB debut with the Cubs on July 9, 1988. His first major league hit came off Ed Whitson on July 9, 1988 against the San Diego Padres. After being traded to the Pirates, Varsho connected off the Cubs’ Shawn Boskie for his first big league home run on July 2, 1992, at Wrigley Field.

Varsho appeared for the Pirates in the 1991 and 1992 National League Championship Series; in three postseason games (all as a pinch hitter), he singled twice in three at bats, and spent one defensive inning in right field.

Primarily an outfielder, Varsho played 14 years of pro baseball, including eight seasons in the major leagues (–).

After playing
Varsho was the Phillies bench coach (–) and was interim manager for the last two games of the  season, after Larry Bowa was fired. Varsho was fired as the Pirates’ bench coach on August 8, 2010. In , he became a professional scout for the Los Angeles Angels. Since , Varsho has served in the same capacity for the Pirates.

Personal life
In 1979, Varsho graduated from Marshfield High School in Marshfield, Wisconsin, after which he attended University of Wisconsin-Oshkosh, where he received a bachelor's degree in physical education in 1989.

Varsho and his wife, Kay have three children: daughters Andie and Taylor, born October 19, 1991, and April 12, 1994 respectively; son Daulton, born July 2, 1996, who is a professional baseball catcher and outfielder for the Toronto Blue Jays.

References

External links

Gary Varsho at SABR (Baseball BioProject)
Gary Varsho at Baseball Almanac
Gary Varsho  Pittsburgh Pirates Bio

1961 births
Living people
Baseball players from Wisconsin
Buffalo Bisons (minor league) players
Chicago Cubs players
Cincinnati Reds players
Indianapolis Indians players
Iowa Cubs players
Los Angeles Angels scouts
Los Angeles Angels of Anaheim scouts
Major League Baseball bench coaches
Major League Baseball outfielders
Major League Baseball right fielders
Midland Cubs players
People from Marshfield, Wisconsin
Philadelphia Phillies managers
Philadelphia Phillies coaches
Philadelphia Phillies players
Pittsfield Cubs players
Pittsburgh Pirates coaches
Pittsburgh Pirates players
Pittsburgh Pirates scouts
Quad Cities Cubs players
Reading Phillies managers
Salinas Spurs players
University of Wisconsin–Oshkosh alumni
Wisconsin–Oshkosh Titans baseball players